Micaela Belén Vázquez (born November 24, 1986) is an Argentine actress and television presenter.
She is the best known for her role of Pilar Dunoff in the series Rebelde Way, and also for series Chiquititas and Floricienta—all created and produced by Cris Morena.

Career
Vázquez was only ten when she landed the role of Miki in television hit series for children and teenagers, Chiquititas, created by Cris Morena. Vázquez reprised her role on 2001 mini–series Chiquititas. However, her most famous role is Pilar Dunoff in another Cris Morena's production, Rebelde Way, co–starring Benjamin Rojas, Luisana Lopilato, Felipe Colombo and Camila Bordonaba. Vázques portrayed Pilar from 2002 to 2003, from the beginning until the very end. She was singing the back vocals at the two tours of Rebelde Way musical group, pop rock sensation Erreway, Erreway en Grand Rex and Nuestro Tiempo. Vázquez also appeared in Erreway's videos "Sweet Baby", "Resistiré", "Tiempo" and "Para Cosas Buenas".

In 2004, Vázquez appeared as Renata in television series Floricienta, one more hit of Cris Morena, co–starring Benjamin Rojas, Florencia Bertotti, Juan Gil Navarro and Isabel Macedo. In 2006, she appeared in film Crónica de una fuga. Vázquez also had guest appearances in hit television series such as Casados con Hijos (2005), Sos mi vida (2006), Chiquititas 2006 (2006) and Son de Fierro (2007).

Personal life
Vázquez stated that her favorite sports are handball and football; and supports football club Boca Juniors.

From 2007 to 2010, she dated Real Madrid CF player Fernando Gago, who left his girlfriend Silvina Luna for her. In 2009, it was reported Vázquez was involved with other Real Madrid CF Argentine player, Gonzalo Higuaín,

On November 15, 2017, she married in a civil ceremony with Federico Larroca. On November 18, 2017, she got married in a religious ceremony with Federico Larroca. The couple divorced on November 18, 2019.

Since December 2019 she has been in a relationship with Gerónimo Klein, a Surfing Instructor. On August 2, 2020, Micaela Vázquez and Gerónimo Klein announced that they were expecting their first baby. On December 31, 2020, Baltazar Klein was born by Caesarean section.

Filmography

Television

Theater

Movies

Television Programs

Discography

Soundtrack albums 

 2001—Chiquititas Vol. 7
 2004—Floricienta

Erreway

References

External links
 

1986 births
Argentine female models
21st-century Argentine women singers
Argentine film actresses
Argentine stage actresses
Argentine telenovela actresses
Argentine television actresses
Association footballers' wives and girlfriends
Living people
Actresses from Buenos Aires
21st-century Argentine women